Ghulam Mohammad Lot was a Pakistani politician belonging to the Pakistan Peoples Party. He was a member of the Provincial Assembly of Sindh. His son Gul Muhammad Lot was a senator.

Biography
Lot was elected as a member of the Provincial Assembly of Sindh from PS-57 (Badin-III) in 1993.

Lot died of cardiac arrest on 25 October 2019 at the age of 90.

References

Pakistan People's Party MPAs (Sindh)
Sindh MPAs 1993–1996
1920s births
2019 deaths
People from Tharparkar District